The Urdhva lokas or upper spheres of the world are composed of seven lokas or "world" according to Hindu mythology. The detailed explanation of them is found in Vishnu Purana.  The three highest Lokas (realms), Jana, Tapa, and Satya are styled durable while Maharloka, has a mixed character; for although it is deserted at the end of the Kalpa, it was not destroyed yet.

List of lokas

Bhūloka

The sphere of the Earth or Bhū-loka (‘Bhu’ means ‘Earth’ and ‘loka’ means the surface of the Earth), comprehending its oceans, mountains, and rivers, extends as far as it is illuminated by the rays of the sun and moon; and to the same extent, both in diameter and circumference, the sphere of the sky (Bhuva-loka) spreads above it (as far upwards as to the planetary sphere, or Swarga-loka).

Bhuva Loka 
The region, where the Siddhas and other celestial beings move, is the Earth's atmospheric sphere which also contains space which has its neighbouring planets in the solar system along with stars and comets.

Swarga Loka

The interval between the sun and Dhruva, extending fourteen hundred thousand leagues, is inhabited by the Devas, including Devis with their king Indra and it's references make it equivalent to the Swarga (heaven), while some Puranic references equate Swarga aloka to the Solar System.

Maharloka
Above Dhruva, at the distance of ten million leagues, lies the sphere of saints, or Mahar-loka, the inhabitants of which dwell in it throughout a Kalpa, or day of Brahmā.

Janaloka

At twice that distance is situated Janaloka, where the Sanandana (four Kumaras) and other pure-minded children of Brahmā reside.

Tapaloka

At four times the distance, between the two last, lies the Tapa-loka (the sphere of penance), inhabited by the immortal beings and deities called Vaibhrájas, who are highly knowledgeable, pure, and enlightened, whereby they can easily travel to the uppermost realm, Satya-loka, are unconsumable by fire of destruction during the dissolution of the universe.

Satyaloka 

It is highest plane of consciousness or the highest of the heavenly realms. It is also called Brahma Loka where Brahma and his wife, Saraswati, resides. It is six times the distance (or twelve Crores, a hundred and twenty millions of leagues) and is referred to as the sphere of truth, where all the knowledge is available and the inhabitants never die, become old, become ill, have pain and anxiety.

See also

 Paatala loka
 Jainism and non-creationism
 Loka

References

Locations in Hindu mythology